Keith D. Cooper is an American computer scientist, currently the L. John and Ann H. Doerr Professor of Computational Engineering at Rice University. He has been a Professor of Computer Science at Rice since July 1989 and served as the chair of that department from 2002 to 2008. As 
of July 2019, he serves as the Chair of the Department of Computational and Applied Mathematics.  His primary research area has been program analysis and optimization.  He was one of the founding members of the compiler group at Rice. He and Linda Torczon co-authored the book Engineering a Compiler.

References

Year of birth missing (living people)
Living people
American computer scientists
Rice University alumni
Rice University faculty